Coffield is a surname. Notable people with the surname include:

Darren Coffield (born 1969), British painter
Glen Coffield (1917–1981), American poet and conscientious objector
Kelly Coffield Park (born 1962), American actress and comedian
Peter Coffield (1945–1983), American actor
Randy Coffield (born 1953), American football player
Andrew Coffield (born 1990), 
American Pastor and Counselor

See also
Coffield Unit, a prison in Anderson County, Texas, United States